New Northwest Broadcasters, headquartered in Bellevue, Washington, operated 38 radio stations in seven cities in the Pacific Northwest and Alaska. Prior to the company's bankruptcy, its stations were located in Alaska (Anchorage and Fairbanks), Montana (Billings), Oregon (Astoria and Klamath Falls), and Washington (Yakima).

Stations owned

Anchorage, Alaska
KDBZ 102.1
KFAT 92.9
KBBO-FM 92.1
KXLW 96.3

Astoria, Oregon
KAST 1370
KJOX-FM 99.7

Billings, Montana
In 2009, New Northwest spun its Billings cluster off  to company president and CEO Pete Benedetti.

KGHL 790
KGHL-FM 98.5
KRSQ 101.9
KQBL 105.1
KRPM 107.5

Fairbanks, Alaska
KCBF 820
KFAR 660
KXLR 95.9
KTDZ 103.9
KWLF 98.1

Yakima, Washington
KARY-FM 100.9
KJOX 1390
KHHK 99.7
KBBO 980
KRSE 105.7
KXDD 104.1

See also
List of radio stations in Alaska
List of radio stations in Montana
List of radio stations in Oregon
List of radio stations in Washington

References

External links
Official website

Defunct radio broadcasting companies of the United States
Companies based in Bellevue, Washington